WOW Gospel 2015 is the seventeenth album in the WOW Gospel series. Motown Gospel, RCA Inspiration, Word Records, and Curb Records released the album on February 3, 2015.

Track listing

Charts

References

2015 compilation albums
Gospel compilation albums
WOW series albums
Christian music compilation albums